Collingwood station may refer to:

Collingwood railway station, in Victoria, Australia
Joyce–Collingwood station, a rapid transit station in Vancouver, Canada
Collingwood Road tube station, a proposed rapid transit station in London, England
Victoria Park railway station, Melbourne, the original station serving Collingwood, Victoria